Jamel Aït Ben Idir (born 10 January 1984) is a French-Moroccan former professional footballer who played as a midfielder.

Career
Born in Mont-Saint-Aignan, Aït Ben Idir joined Le Havre in 2000 as a youth player. He made his professional debut for the club in a Ligue 2 match on 26 March 2002 against AC Ajaccio playing the full 90 minutes in a 1–0 loss. Following promotion that season, Ait-Ben-Idir did not feature in Ligue 1 play that season only appearing in one match. He would proceed to become a regular in the squad the next five seasons contributing to Le Havre's return to Ligue 1 for the 2008–09 season. He then moved on to AC Arles-Avignon, Sedan, and Ligue 2 club AJ Auxerre.

After the expiration of his Auxerre contract, Aït Ben Idir joined Wydad Casablanca on a two-year deal.

References

External links
 
 Profile at LFP

1984 births
Living people
People from Mont-Saint-Aignan
Sportspeople from Seine-Maritime
French sportspeople of Moroccan descent
Moroccan footballers
French footballers
Footballers from Normandy
Association football midfielders
Morocco international footballers
Ligue 1 players
Ligue 2 players
Le Havre AC players
AC Arlésien players
CS Sedan Ardennes players
AJ Auxerre players
Wydad AC players
Fath Union Sport players